International Journal of Social Welfare is a quarterly peer-reviewed academic journal published by Wiley-Blackwell. The journal was established in 1992 as Scandinavian Journal of Social Welfare, obtaining its current name in 1999. The journal covers topics associated with social welfare and social work and their regional and global implications. The current editors-in-chief are Åke Bergmark and Jill Duerr Berrick.

Aims and scope 
Coverage of the journal includes current interdisciplinary research and comparative perspective of the most pressing social welfare issues of various branches of the applied social sciences. The focus includes social issues related to migration, economy, policy, case studies, protection, mental health, gender, age, and class.

References

External links 
 

Wiley-Blackwell academic journals
English-language journals
Publications established in 1992
Quarterly journals
Sociology journals